Tasos Vidouris (1888–1967) was a Greek poet and author.

He was born in the village of Dhrovjani (Delvinë District) in modern southern Albania. After finishing ground studies in his village Vidouris entered the Phanar Greek Orthodox College in Istanbul. With his graduation he became a Greek language teacher in his home place as well as in several other Greek schools in the region. He studied in France and became familiar with French literature.

In ca. 1930 he moved to Patras, Greece, and in 1938 he published his first collection of several short stories under the title Diigimata. Vidouris also became Professor in the local University, for a while, shortly before his death in 1967.

Tasos Vidouris published his main collection of poetry under the title Ilissia. His poetic style follows
Naturalism, as it tried to describe local customs and psychological states. He also translated several known works from French to Greek.

His novels were published in a collection under the title Diigimata ). Vidouris also translated French works.

References

External links
Short stories of Tasos Vidouris. openarchives.gr.

1888 births
1967 deaths
Albanian people of Greek descent
People from Finiq
20th-century poets from the Ottoman Empire
Novelists from the Ottoman Empire
University of Patras
20th-century Greek poets
20th-century novelists
Greek male poets
Male poets from the Ottoman Empire
20th-century Greek male writers